In geometry, the Cesàro equation of a plane curve is an equation relating the curvature at a point of the curve to the arc length from the start of the curve to the given point. It may also be given as an equation relating the radius of curvature to arc length. (These are equivalent because .) Two congruent curves will have the same Cesàro equation. Cesàro equations are named after Ernesto Cesàro.

Examples
Some curves have a particularly simple representation by a Cesàro equation. Some examples are:
 Line: .
 Circle: , where  is the radius.
 Logarithmic spiral: , where  is a constant.
 Circle involute: , where  is a constant.
 Cornu spiral: , where  is a constant.
 Catenary: .

Related parameterizations

References

External links
 
 
 Curvature Curves at 2dcurves.com.

Curves